King Ai may refer to:

King Ai of Zhou (died 441 BC)
King Ai of Chu (died 228 BC)